This is a listing of the horses that finished in either first, second, or third place and the number of starters in the Dinner Party Stakes, at Pimlico Race Course in Baltimore, Maryland, an American grade 2 thoroughbred horse race run at 1-1/8 miles on the turf. The race was the second leg of the former "Triple Turf.".

{| class = "wikitable sortable" | border="1" cellpadding="0" style="border-collapse: collapse; font-size:90%"
|- bgcolor="#77dd77" align="center"
| width="45px" | Year 
| width="130px" | Winner 
| width="125px" | Second 
| width="120px" | Third 
| width="55px" |Starters
|-
| align=center|2022
|Set Piece 
|Tango Tango Tango
|Atone
| align=center|7
|-
| align=center|2021
| Somelikeithotbrown
| Talk or Listen
| Midnight Tea Time 
| align=center|8
|-
| align=center|2020
| Factor This
| Somelikeithotbrown
| Hembree
| align=center|7
|-
| align=center|2019
| Catholic boy
| Admission Office
| Just Howard
| align=center|12
|-
| align=center|2018
| Fire Away
| Unbridled Juan
| Just Howard
| align=center|8
|-
| align=center|2017
| World Approval
| Projected
| Blacktype
| align=center|11
|-
| align=center|2016
| Takeover Target
| Ring Weekend
| Grand Arch
| align=center|14
|-
| align=center|2015
| Ironicus
| Cage Fighter
| Up With the Birds
| align=center|14
|-
| align=center|2014
| Utley
| Hey Leroy
| Chamois
| align=center|10
|-
| align=center|2013
| Skyring
| Willcox Inn
| Optimizer
| align=center|13
|-
| align=center|2012
| Hudson Steele
| Humble and Hungry
| Fort Dei Marmi
| align=center|11
|-
| align=center|2011
| Paddy O'Prado
| Baryshnikov
| Bim Bam
| align=center|10
|-
| align=center|2010
| Strike a Deal
| Just as Well
| Rahystrada 
| align=center|12
|-
| align=center|2009
| Parading
| Just As Well
| Wesley
| align=center|11
|-
| align=center|2008
| Pays to Dream
| Stay Close
| Ra Der Dean
| align=center|9
|-
| align=center|2007
| Remarkable News
| Cosmonaught
| Outperformance
| align=center|11
|-
| align=center|2006
| Better Talk Now 
| Dreadnaught
| Artie Schiller 
| align=center|7
|-
| align=center|2005
| Cool Conductor
| Artie Schiller  
| Good Reward
| align=center|5
|-
| align=center|2004
| Mr. O'Brien
| Millennium Dragon
| Warleigh
| align=center|11
|-
| align=center|2003
| Dr. Brendler
| Perfect Soul
| Sardaukar
| align=center|6
|-
| align=center|2002
| Strut the Stage
| Del Mar Show
| Slew the Red
| align=center|7
|-
| align=center|2001
| Hap
| Make No Mistake
| Cynics Beware
| align=center|8
|-
| align=center|2000
| Quiet Resolve
| Haami
| Holditholditholdit
| align=center|9
|-
| align=center|1999
| Middlesex Drive
| Sky Colony
| Divide and Conquer
| align=center|10
|-
| align=center|1998 
| Yagli 
| Sky Colony 
| Blazing Sword
| align=center|12
|-
| align=center|1997 
| Ops Smile 
| Brave Note
| Sharp Appeal 
| align=center|8
|-
| align=center|1996 
| Gold and Steel
| Same Old Wish 
| Comstock Lode
| align=center|9
|-
| align=center|1995 
| The Vid 
| Pennine Ridge 
| Blue's Traveller 
| align=center|6
|-
| align=center|1994 
| Paradise Creek   
| Lure  
| Astudillo 
| align=center|5
|-
| align=center|1993 
| Lure 
| Star of Cozzene
| Binary Light
| align=center|8
|-
| align=center|1992 
| Sky Classic  
| Fourstars Allstar
| Social Retiree
| align=center|10
|-
| align=center|1991 
| Double Booked 
| Chas' Whim 
| Opening Verse  
| align=center|9
|-
| align=center|1990 
| ''Two Moccasins 
| My Big Boy 
| Marksmanship
| align=center|10
|-
| align=center|1989 
| Coeur de Lion| Dance Card Filled
| Dynaformer  
| align=center|10
|-
| align=center|1988
| Kadial 
| Top Guest 
| Milesius
| align=center|5
|-
| align=center|1987 
| Akabir 
| Little Bold John 
| Vilzak  
| align=center|9
|-
| align=center|1986
| Uptown Swell 
| Southern Sultan
| Carlypha
| align=center|13
|-
| align=center|1985 
| Nassipour 
| Persian Tiara
| Computer's Choice  
| align=center|8
|-
| align=center|1984 
| Persian Tiara| Crazy Moon
| Canadian Factor
| align=center|8
|-
| align=center|1983 
| Khatango| The Times
| Super Sunrise
| align=center|10
|-
|align=center|1982 
|Robsphere
|Present the Colors
|Rich and Ready
|align=center|13
|-
|align=center|1981 
|El Barril
|Buckpoint
|Birthday List
|align=center|9
|-
|align=center|1980 
|Marquee Universal
|The Very One
|Match the Hatch
|align=center|14
|-
|align=center|1979 
|The Very One
|That's a Nice
|Fluorescent Light
|align=center|8
|-
|align=center|1978
|Fluorescent Light
|That's a Nice
|Improviser
|align=center|7
|-
|align=center|1978 
|Bowl Game   
|Oilfield
|Trumpeter Swan
|align=center|9
|-
|align=center|1977 
|Improviser
|Grey Beret
|Oilfield
|align=center|12
|-
|align=center|1976 
|Barcas
|One On the Aisle
|Neapolitan Way
|align=center|9
|-
|align=center|1975
|Bemo
|Outdoors
|Drollery
|align=center|13
|-
|align=center|1974
|London Company
|Scrimscaw
|Mister Diz
|align=center|9
|-
|align=center|1973
|Laplander
|Chrisaway
|Wustenchef
|align=center|10
|-
|align=center|1972 
|Onondaga
|Star Envoy
|New Alibhai
|align=center|12
|-
|align=center|1971 
|Chompion
|Tudor Reward
|North Flight
|align=center|10
|-
|align=center|1970 
|Fort Marcy  
|War Censor
|Jungle Cove
|align=center|9
|-
|align=center|1969 
|Czar Alexander
|Taneb
|Jean-Pierre
|align=center|n/a
|-
|align=center|1968
|High Hat
|Irish Rebellion
|Royal Malabar
|align=center|n/a
|-
|align=center|1967 
|War Censor
|Deck Hand
|Needle Him
|align=center|n/a
|-
|align=center|1966 
|Knightly Manner
|Marchio
|Paoluccio
|align=center|n/a
|-
|align=center|1965 
|Or et Argent
|Kentucky Jug
|Desert Love
|align=center|n/a
|-
|align=center|1964
|Will I Rule
|Turbo Jet II   
|Your Alibhai
|align=center|n/a
|-
|align=center|1963
|Cedar Key
|Mr Steu
|Parka
|align=center|n/a
|-
|align=center|1962
|Wise Ship
|Sunshine Cake
|El Bandido
|align=center|n/a
|-
|align=center|1961
|Hunter's Rock
|Shield Bearer
|Art Market
|align=center|n/a
|-
|align=center|1960
|Shield Bearer
|Harmonizing
|Mystic II
|align=center|n/a
|-
|align=center|1959
|One-Eyed King
|Oligarchy
|Mystic II
|align=center|n/a
|-
|align=center|1958
|Pop Corn
|Master Boing
|Adare II
|align=center|n/a
|-
|align=center|1957
|Akbar Khan
|Jabneh
|Blue Choir
|align=center|n/a
|-
|align=center|1956
|Chevation
|Akbar Khan
|Maharaiah
|align=center|n/a
|-
|align=center|1955
|St. Vincent   
|Kaster
|Maharaiah
|align=center|n/a
|-
|align=center|1954
|Straight Face
|Golden Gloves
|Capeador
|align=center|n/a
|-
|align=center|1953
|Royal Vale
|Cold Command
|Crafty Admiral   
|align=center|n/a
|-
|align=center|1952
|Altered
|Auditing
|Hull Down
|align=center|n/a
|-
|align=center|1951
|County Delight
|On The Mark
|Why Not Now
|align=center|n/a
|-
|align=center|1950
|Loser Weeper
|Double Brandy
|Going Away
|align=center|n/a
|-
|align=center|1949
|Chains 
|Contest
|Pilaster
|align=center|n/a
|-
|align=center|1948
|Fervent
|Stymie   
|Incline
|align=center|n/a
|-
|align=center|1947
|Assault
|Rico Monte
|Talon
|align=center|n/a
|-
|align=center|1946
|Armed
|Stymie   
|Trymenow
|align=center|n/a
|-
|align=center|1945
|Rounders
|He Rolls
|Gay Bit
|align=center|n/a
|-
|align=center|1944
|Sun Again
|Rounders
|Alquest
|align=center|n/a
|-
|align=center|1943
|Riverland
|Attention
|Anticlimax
|align=center|n/a
|-
|align=center|1942
|Whirlaway  
|Attention
|Mioland
|align=center|n/a
|-
|align=center|1941
|Haltal
|Mioland
|Dit
|align=center|n/a
|-
|align=center|1940
|Honey Cloud
|Filisteo
|Aethelwold
|align=center|n/a
|-
|align=center|1939
|Sir Damion
|Tatterdemalion
|Jacola
|align=center|n/a
|-
|align=center|1938
|Pompoon
|Busy K.
|M'ked General
|align=center|n/a
|-
|align=center|1937
|Calumet Dick
|Finance
|Aneroid
|align=center|n/a
|-
|align=center|1936
|Dark Hope
|Good Goods
|Gallant Mac
|align=center|n/a
|-
|1935
|Only One
|Head Play
|Howard
|
|-
|1934
|Equipoise
|Chatmoss
|Fla'g Mamie
|
|-
|1933
|Stepenfetchit
|Keep Out
|Tred Avon
|
|-
|1932
|Gallant Knight
|Sun Meadow
|Aegis
|
|-
|1931
|Paul Bunyan
|Frisus
|William T
|
|-
|1930
|Sandy Ford
|Inception
|Sir Harry
|
|-
|1929
|Diavolo
|Victorian
|Display
|
|-
|1928
|Mike Hall
|Scapa Flow
|Sir Harry
|
|-
|1927
|Mars
|Display
|Edisto
|
|-
|1926
|Sarazen   
|Sun Pal
|G. Thatcher
|
|-
|1925
|Sarazen  
|Spot Cash
|Joy Smoke
|
|-
|1924
|Chacloet
|Martingale
|Rev. Agent
|
|- bgcolor="#eeeeee"
|1923-to
| No Race 
| No Race
| No Race
| 0
|- bgcolor="#eeeeee"
|1905
| No Race 
| No Race
| No Race
| 0
|-
|1904
|The Southerner
|Ostrich
|Andrew Mack
|
|-
|1903
|Colonsay
|none
|none
|
|-
|1902
|Adelaide Prince
|Potheen
|Flintlock
|
|- bgcolor="#eeeeee"
|1901-to
| No Race 
| No Race
| No Race
| 0
|- bgcolor="#eeeeee"
|1889
| No Race 
| No Race
| No Race
| 0
|-
|1888
|Taragon
|Marauder
|Tea Tray
|
|-
|1887
|Hanover
|Glenmound
|none
|
|-
|1886
|The Bard
|Blue Wing
|Wheatley
|
|-
|1885
|East Lynne
|Richmond
|Longview
|
|-
|1884
|Loftin
|Blast
|Thackeray
|
|-
|1883
|George Kinney
|Trafalgar
|Gonfalon
|
|-
|1882
|Monarch
|Hilarity
|Blenheim
|
|-
|1881
|Crickmore
|Eole
|Barrett
|
|-
|1880
|Grenada
|Oden
|Ferncliffe
|
|-
|1879
|Monitor
|Lord Murphy
|Harold
|
|-
|1878
|Duke of Magenta
|Bonnie Wood
|Spartan
|
|-
|1877
|King Faro
|Major Barker
|Susquehanna
|
|-
|1876
|Vigil
|Parole
|Heretog
|
|-
|1875
|Tom Ochiltree
|Viator
|Joe Cerns
|
|-
|1874
|Vandalite
|Madge
|Brigand
|
|-
|1873
|Tom Bowling
|Merodac
|Lizzie Lucas
|
|-
|1872
|Hubbard
|Joe Daniels
|True Blue
|
|-
|1871
|Harry Bassett
|none
|none
|
|-
|1870
|Preakness
|Ecliptic
|Foster
|
|-
|}

A †'''  designates a Breeders Cup winner.

References

External links
Pimlico racetrack

Lists of horse racing results
Pimlico Race Course